The On Leong Chinese Merchants Association or simply Chinese Merchants Association, formerly known as the On Leong Tong, is a tong society operating out of its territory at the intersection of Canal Street and Mott Street in Chinatown, Manhattan (曼哈頓華埠). Established in November 1893, the tong fought a violent war for control of Chinatown's rackets and businesses with the Hip Sing Tong. In recent years, the Tong has been linked to the Ghost Shadows street gang led by Wing Yeung Chan. Currently, there are over 30,000 registered On Leong members, the majority of them with a commercial or industrial background.

References

Further reading
Denny Lee, Years of the Dragons Information on the history of Ghost Shadows, New York Times, May 11, 2003.
MacIllwain, Jeffrey Scott. Organizing Crime in Chinatown: race and racketeering in New York City, 1890-1910. Jefferson, North Carolina: McFarland & Company, 2004. 

Chinese-American organizations
Chinese-American culture in New York City
Gangs in New York City
Tongs (organizations)